Captain Dynamo is a vertically scrolling platform game developed by Codemasters and released in 1992.  Captain Dynamo, an aging superhero, is brought out of retirement to recover a haul of stolen diamonds from the trap-infested rocket-ship of the villainous Austen Von Flyswatter. It was published for the Amiga, Atari ST, Commodore 64, ZX Spectrum, Amstrad CPC, and MS-DOS. Versions for Game Gear and Mega Drive were planned but never released.

Gameplay
The goal is to collect as many diamonds as possible in each stage and then enter the teleport unit at the top. The task is complicated by various mechanical hazards and creatures.

References

External links
Captain Dynamo at Atari Mania
Captain Dynamo at Lemon Amiga

1992 video games
Amiga games
Amstrad CPC games
Atari ST games
Cancelled Game Gear games
Cancelled Sega Genesis games
Commodore 64 games
DOS games
ZX Spectrum games
Platform games
Video games scored by Allister Brimble
Video games scored by Matthew Simmonds
Video games developed in the United Kingdom